Rapsodi may refer to:

Rapsodi, a genre of Traditional music in Kosovo
Rapsodi, composition by Inger Wikström 1975.
Rapsodi, manga by Eiichiro Oda 2006.
Rapsodi, album by Kirsten Johnson (pianist) Çesk Zadeja; Feim Ibrahimi  Guild Records 2006.
Rapsodi (Olamide album)